Johnny Keyes may refer to:

Johnny Keyes and the Magnificents, an American doo wop group from the 1950s
Johnnie Keyes (1940–2018), African-American pornographic movie actor and amateur boxer